Tevita Tolu Finau (born January 13, 1986) is a New Zealand-born former American football defensive end. He played college football at Utah. He was signed by the Arizona Cardinals as an undrafted free agent in 2012. 

He has been a member of the Philadelphia Eagles, Dallas Cowboys, New York Jets, and Houston Texans.

Early years
Born in Hamilton, New Zealand, to Tolu and Takinima Finau, he lived in Maui until he was eight, in Tonga from years 8 to 12, and in Hawaii until he finished high school. Finau attended three high schools in Hawaii: Lahaina High School as a freshman and sophomore, Maui High School in his junior year, and Kahuku High & Intermediate School as a senior. He helped Kahuku win the Hawaii State Championship in 2004.

College career
Finau played two seasons of junior college football for Phoenix College before originally committing to play football at West Virginia University. The highly-touted recruit never made it to Morgantown however, and Finau eventually ended up enrolling at the University of Utah, where he appeared in 21 games in his two-year career for the Utes and finished with 42 tackles.

Professional career

Dallas Cowboys
Finau was signed to the Dallas Cowboys practice squad on November 14, 2012 after going undrafted and spending time in training camp with both the Arizona Cardinals and Philadelphia Eagles. Finau was released from the practice squad on November 27, 2012.

New York Jets
Finau was signed to the New York Jets practice squad on December 5, 2012. He signed a future/reserve contract on December 31, 2012. He was released on August 31, 2013. He was signed to the team's practice squad a day later. Finau was released on August 30, 2014 and signed to the team's practice squad a day later.

Houston Texans
Finau was signed by the Houston Texans to a reserve futures contract on December 30, 2014. He was cut on September 6, 2015.

References

External links
Utah Utes bio

1986 births
Living people
New Zealand players of American football
People from Lahaina, Hawaii
American football defensive ends
Utah Utes football players
Arizona Cardinals players
Philadelphia Eagles players
Dallas Cowboys players
New York Jets players
Houston Texans players
American people of Tongan descent
New Zealand sportspeople of Tongan descent
New Zealand emigrants to the United States